Geoffrey Saxton White VC (2 July 1886 – 28 January 1918) was an English Royal Navy officer and recipient of the Victoria Cross, the highest and most prestigious award for gallantry in the face of the enemy that can be awarded to British and Commonwealth forces.

Early life and career
Educated at Bradfield College, he was in September 1902 appointed a naval cadet on the armoured cruiser HMS Aboukir, serving with the Mediterranean Fleet.

He was 31 years old, and a Lieutenant-Commander during the First World War when he won the VC.

The VC action
On 28 January 1918 in the Dardanelles, Turkey, Lieutenant-Commander White, commanding British submarine E.14 was under instructions to find the German battlecruiser Goeben, which was reported to be aground. She was not found, however, and E.14 turned back.  Then came the following sequence of events, for which White was posthumously awarded the VC on 24 May 1919:

White's body was not recovered at the time, and he has no known grave.  He is commemorated on the Portsmouth Naval Memorial.

References

Monuments to Courage (David Harvey, 1999)
The Register of the Victoria Cross (This England, 1997)
VCs of the First World War - The Naval VCs (Stephen Snelling, 2002)

External links

 

1886 births
1918 deaths
People from Bromley
British World War I recipients of the Victoria Cross
Royal Navy submarine commanders
British military personnel killed in World War I
Royal Navy recipients of the Victoria Cross
Royal Navy officers of World War I